Cymatura orientalis is a species of beetle in the family Cerambycidae. It was described by Stephan von Breuning in 1968. It is known from Tanzania.

References

Endemic fauna of Tanzania
Xylorhizini
Beetles described in 1968